Sigurd Grytten (born 9 September 1972) is a Norwegian lobbyist and member of the Labour Party.

Grytten works with the lobbyist firm Zync. He previously served as a deputy representative to the Norwegian Parliament from Hordaland during the term 1997–2001. From 2000 to 2001 he was a regular representative, covering for Olav Akselsen who was appointed to the first cabinet Stoltenberg.
From 2001 to 2002 he was the leader of the Norwegian branch of the European Movement.

References

1972 births
Living people
Labour Party (Norway) politicians
Members of the Storting
21st-century Norwegian politicians
20th-century Norwegian politicians